, formerly known as , is a city in the central eastern part of Hyōgo Prefecture, Japan. , the city had an estimated population of 40,050 in 17523 households and a population density of 110 persons per km2. The total area of the city is

Geography
Tamba-Sasayama is located in an inland basin surrounded by mountains on all sides in the eastern part of the prefecture. It is located in the mountains between the Seto Inland Sea and the Sea of Japan.

Neighboring municipalities
Hyōgo Prefecture
Tamba
Nishiwaki
Sanda
Katō
Inagawa
Osaka Prefecture
Nose
Kyoto Prefecture
Nantan
Fukuchiyama
Kyōtamba

Climate
Tamba-Sasayama has a Humid subtropical climate (Köppen Cfa) characterized by warm summers and cool winters with light to no snowfall.  The average annual temperature in Tamba-Sasayama is 13.3 °C. The average annual rainfall is 1582 mm with September as the wettest month. The temperatures are highest on average in August, at around 25.2 °C, and lowest in January, at around 1.8 °C.

Demographics
Per Japanese census data, the population of Tamba-Sasayama peaked around 1950 and has been relatively stable for the past 50 years.

History
The area of Tamba-Sasayama was part of ancient Tanba Province, and corresponds almost exactly with ancient Taki District. Sasayama developed as a castle town around Sasayama Castle, which was constructed in the early Edo Period. The town of Sasayama was established on April 1, 1889, with the creation of the modern municipalities system, and expanded its borders through municipal mergers with neighboring villages in 1955 and 1975. It was raised to city status on April 1, 1999, from the merger of the former town of Sasayama, absorbing the towns of Konda, Nishiki and Tannan (all from Taki District).

On November 18, 2018, the city held a successful referendum on changing its name from Sasayama to Tamba-Sasayama in reference to the historical Tanba Province, which still has some influence on local branding and politics. The referendum about changing a municipality's name is the first of its kind in Japan, and the new name officially came into effect in May 2019.

Government
Tamba-Sasayama has a mayor-council form of government with a directly elected mayor and a unicameral city council of 18 members. Tamba-Sasayama contributes one member to the Hyogo Prefectural Assembly. In terms of national politics, the city is part of Hyōgo fifth district of the lower house of the Diet of Japan.

Economy
Tamba-Sasayama has mostly a rural economy based on agriculture and forestry. Tamba-Sasayama is well known in the Kansai region for its agriculture and food products, specifically kuromame or kuro daizu (black soybeans), mountain yam, Japanese chestnuts, azuki beans, matsutake, beef, wild boar and venison. Tourism, including agritourism, is playing an increasing role in the local economy.

Education
Tamba-Sasayama has 14 public elementary schools and six public middle schools operated by the city government and three public high schools operated by the Hyōgo Prefectural Department of Education.

Transportation

Railway 
 JR West – Fukuchiyama Line
 -  -  -  -

Highways 
  Maizuru-Wakasa Expressway

Sister city relations
 - Walla Walla, Washington, United States, since August 15, 1972
 - Epidaurus, Greece,  since May 26, 1988

Local attractions 

 Yakami Castle ruins, National Historic Site
 Sasayama Castle ruins, National Historic Site
 Sasayama Traditional Buildings Preservation Area
 Fukuzumi Traditional Buildings Preservation Area
 Mount Mitake
 Mount Nishigatake
 Mount Yajuro

Festivals
The Dekansho Festival, famous for "Bon" style dancing, is held annually, every August 15 through 16 since 1952.

Local products
 Tamba ware, or tamba-tachikui-yaki, is a traditional style of pottery that has been produced here since the 12th century.

References

External links

 Sasayama City official website 
 Sasayama City official website 
Tamba-Sasayama City tourist information website(in English)

Cities in Hyōgo Prefecture
Tamba-Sasayama